The stater was an ancient coin used in various regions of Greece. The term is also used for similar coins, imitating Greek staters, minted elsewhere in ancient Europe.

History 

The stater, as a Greek silver currency, first as ingots, and later as coins, circulated from the 8th century BC to AD 50. The earliest known stamped stater (having the mark of some authority in the form of a picture or words) is an electrum turtle coin, struck at Aegina that dates to about 650 BC. It is on display at the Bibliothèque Nationale in Paris. 
According to Robin Lane Fox, the stater as a weight unit was borrowed by the Euboean stater weighing  from the Phoenician shekel, which had about the same weight as a stater and was also one fiftieth of a mina.

Staters were also struck in several Greek city-states such as, Aegina, Aspendos, Delphi, Knossos, Kydonia, many city-states of Ionia, Lampsacus, Megalopolis, Metapontium, Olympia, Phaistos, Poseidonia, Syracuse, Taras, Thasos, Thebes and more.

There also existed a "gold stater", but it was only minted in some places, and was mainly an accounting unit worth 20–28 drachmae depending on place and time, the Athenian unit being worth 20 drachmae. The use of gold staters in coinage seems mostly of Macedonian origin. The best known types of Greek gold staters are the 28-drachma kyzikenoi from Cyzicus.

Non-Greek staters

Celtic tribes brought the concept to Western and Central Europe after obtaining it while serving as mercenaries in north Greece. Gold staters were minted in Gaul by Gallic chiefs modelled after the philippeioi of Philip II of Macedonia, which were brought back after serving in his armies, or those of Alexander and his successors. Some of these staters in the form of the Gallo-Belgic series were imported to Britain on a large scale. These went on to influence a range of staters produced in Britain.

Celtic staters were also minted in present-day Czech Republic and Poland. The conquests of Alexander extended Greek culture east, leading to the adoption of staters in Asia. Gold staters have also been found from the ancient region of Gandhara from the time of Kanishka.

In 2018, archaeologists in Podzemelj, Slovenia unearthed fifteen graves at the Pezdirčeva Njiva site. In one of the graves they found a bronze belt with a gold coin.
The coin was a Celtic imitation of the Alexander the Great stater, depicting Nike and Athena, and dates back to the first half of the 3rd century B.C.

Gallery

See also 

 Coson
Egyptian gold stater
Silver stater with a turtle

References

External links 
 
 The British Museum- Electrum 1/6 stater (650–600 BCE)
 Silver stater with Pegasus and head of Athena wearing a Corinthian helmet, Akarnania, (Akarnanian Confederacy) c. 250–167 BCE, Thyrreion mint
Stater coins (review article)

Coins
Numismatics
Coins of ancient Greece